Tomašević (Cyrillic: Toмaшeвић), Tomasevic or Tomasevich is a Slavic patronymic surname, equivalent to Thomson or Thompson. Notable people with the surname include:

Aleksandar Tomašević (1908–1988), Serbian Yugoslav international football player and manager
Anđelka Tomašević (born 1993), Serbian model
Bojan Tomašević (born 2001), Montenegrin basketball player
Dejan Tomašević (born 1973), Serbian professional basketball player
Dragana Tomašević (born 1982), Serbian discus thrower
Dragutin Tomašević (1890–1915), track and field athlete and gymnast from the Kingdom of Serbia
Goran Tomasevic (born 1969), international war photographer
Guillermo Tomasevich (born 1987), Peruvian footballer
Ivan Tomašević, several people
Ivo Tomašević (born 1960), catholic priest
Jelena Tomašević (born 1983), Serbian pop singer
Josip Tomašević (disambiguation), several people
Jozo Tomasevich (1908–1994), Croatian American scholar
Katarina Tomašević (born 1984), Serbian female handball player
Kosta Tomašević (1923–1976), Yugoslavian (Serbian) football player
Petar Tomašević (born 1989), French water polo player of Montenegrin origin
Sanja Tomašević (born 1980), Serbian American volleyball player and coach
Sigismund Tomašević, birth name of a Bosnian prince who became Ishak Bey Kraloğlu, Ottoman sanjak-bey
Stana Tomašević (1920–1983), Montenegrin Yugoslav Partisan, model, politician and diplomat
Stephen Tomašević of Bosnia, ruled from 1461 to 1463 as the last King of Bosnia
Tanja Tomašević Damnjanović (born 1982), Serbian politician
Tomislav Tomašević (born 1983), Croatian activist and politician
Vincent Tomasevich Thomas (1907–1980), Croatian American politician
Vuko Tomasevic (born 1980), Australian football (soccer) player of Serbian descent
Žarko Tomašević (born 1990), Montenegrin footballer

See also
Tomasevich Pegasus or Tomashevich Pegasus, World War II Soviet ground attack prototype aircraft
Tomaš (surname)
Thomas (disambiguation)
Tomasi
Tomasz (disambiguation)
Tommasi
Toomas (given name)

Croatian surnames
Montenegrin surnames
Serbian surnames
Patronymic surnames
Surnames from given names